The Raymond M. Alf Museum of Paleontology is a paleontology museum in Claremont, California, that is part of The Webb Schools. It is the only nationally accredited museum on a secondary school campus in the United States.  The museum has two circular 4,000 sq. ft. exhibition halls and 20,000 unique annual visitors. The collections number about 140,000 specimens, 95% of which were found by Webb students on fossil-collecting trips called “Peccary Trips,” expeditions usually centered in California, Utah, and Montana. The collections consist primarily of vertebrate, invertebrate, and track fossils and the museum's large track collection is widely recognized as one of the most diverse in the world.

The museum has three full-time staff, two of whom are research paleontologists who conduct research with Webb students in a specialized curriculum through The Webb Schools' Science Department.

History 

In 1929, nationally acclaimed sprinter Raymond Alf arrived in Los Angeles to run for the L.A. Track Club. After the track season ended, Alf found a job teaching science at the Webb School of California, a boarding school on the outskirts of Los Angeles. Alf's paleontology career unofficially began in 1935, when he spotted a fossil horse jaw at a photo shop and learned that it was found near Barstow. Intrigued, Alf then gathered Webb students and went in search of fossils in the Barstow desert. On that first trip, Bill Webb, son of the Webb School's founder Thompson Webb, found a fossil skull. Alf and Bill Webb took the specimen to Chester Stock, a paleontologist from the California Institute of Technology, who identified it as a new species of Miocene-age peccary.  Inspired by the discovery of "Dyseohys fricki", Alf began the long-standing museum tradition of leading summer and weekend paleontology expeditions (known as Peccary Trips) for Webb students to fossil-rich areas in the western United States.

On the first Summer Peccary trip in Nebraska in 1937, Alf  met Professor John Clark from the University of Colorado who encouraged Alf to become a paleontologist. Alf took a sabbatical and completed his master's degree in geology at the University of Colorado in a single academic year.  When he returned to Webb to teach, Alf added paleontology into his biology curriculum and established a small museum in the basement of the school's library. Alf's enthusiasm for paleontology was unrelenting and throughout the 1950s and 1960s he led hundreds of peccary trips.  Consequently, the student paleontology program at Webb became a school tradition.  Spurred by Alf's inspirational teaching, a number of Webb students became distinguished paleontologists, including the late Malcolm McKenna  (Class of 1948, Columbia University/ Frick Curator of Vertebrate Paleontology at the American Museum of Natural History) and  Dwight Taylor  (Class of 1949, he was one of the world's foremost  malacologists, specializing in gastropods), as well as David Webb  (Class of 1953, retired Curator of Paleontology at the Florida Museum of Natural History), and Daniel Fisher (Class of 1967, currently a curator at the Museum of Paleontology at the University of Michigan).

By the mid-1960s a larger space was needed to house the collections made by Alf and his students.  Thus, in 1968, a new two-story circular facility was built and named in honor of Ray Alf.  This facility, originally known as the Raymond M. Alf Museum, is still in use today, although the museum is now named the Raymond M. Alf Museum of Paleontology in accordance with its mission which is focused solely on paleontology.

Exhibits

Hall of Life 

The Hall of Life, renovated in 2011, is located on the museum's upper floor and provides an overview of the history of life on earth. Modeled after a time spiral, the hall illustrates the evolution of beings, from the first record of life through human civilization. On display are ancient single-celled and multicellular organisms, as well as fossilized invertebrates, including a cast of the world's largest  trilobite. Dinosaurs are represented by casts of skulls (Diabloceratops, Gryposaurus, Nanotyrannus, Pachycephalosaurus, Tyrannosaurus rex), and skeletons of Allosaurus and Centrosaurus, among others.  A large collection of fossil mammals from North America, including saber toothed cats, brontotheres, and three-toed horses is also featured.  The exhibit ends with a series of temporary displays which show the results of recently completed research projects of museum staff and Webb students.  Currently on temporary display is “Baby Joe”, a young Parasaurolophus discovered in 2009 by students in the Kaiparowits Formation in southern Utah.

Hall of Footprints 
The Hall of Footprints, unlike the former, it is the largest section with a diversity of fossil footprints collections that are on display in the United States of America. The display has a variety of collections such as track-ways and tracks that are made dinosaurs, camels, spiders and elephants.  There are more of skeletons of camel, giant bear-dog, whose skeletons are all complete. These skeletons are mounted on top of it track-way for fossil. The display of all these fossil collections puts the museum on top in the track collection as the most fundamental legacy of life history store.

Research activities

Student research 

The Raymond Alf Museum of Paleontology acts as a unique resource for students of The Webb Schools as they have the opportunity to function as actual paleontologists through hands-on field, lab, and class-based activities. In addition to collecting important fossils on peccary trips, Webb students are involved in all steps of the scientific process including removal from encasing rock and eventual study in the museum's capstone science course, Honors Advanced Museum Research. With access to a fully equipped and modern research lab, students do original research on the fossils they find in collaboration with museum staff, and publish their results in peer reviewed scientific journals.  Webb students also attend regional and international paleontology conferences to present their research and interact with scientists from all over the world.

Peccary trips 

Since the late 1930s, fossil collecting trips for Webb students have been known as Peccary Trips. During the academic year, most Peccary Trips are centered on Southern California locales, like the Barstow and Goler formations in the Mojave Desert.   On these trips, students learn collection techniques such as prospecting, quarrying, and screen-washing.

Every year since 1937, the museum has offered a Summer Peccary Trip for Webb students, co-led by Museum Director Dr. Don Lofgren and Augustyn Family Curator of Paleontology Dr. Andrew Farke. This expedition leads students to collect fossils in remote areas of Utah and Montana. Presently, the museum summer field research is centered on projects in the Kaiparowits Formation of southern Utah  and the Renova Formation of southwest Montana.

Paleontology classes 

As part of the freshman science curriculum, every Webb student learns the basics of the geological time, evolution, and other processes that shape our planet. In advanced paleontology electives, Honors Advanced Study in Paleontology and Honors Museum Research, students acquire the scientific background necessary to work with fossils, as they learn how museums procure, curate, exhibit, and identify fossils. Also, they are given mini research projects, which involve the review of relevant scientific literature, as well as analysis and interpretation of paleontological data. In the Honors Advanced Museum Research course (for juniors and seniors), students work on a project under the supervision of Museum Director Dr. Lofgren or Augustyn Family Curator of Paleontology Dr. Farke. Student research projects result in significant contributions to knowledge and are usually published in regional or internationals scientific journals. Since 2008, Webb students have been primary or secondary authors in more than 10 peer-reviewed scientific articles.

Peccary Society 

The Peccary Society is the exploration and research arm of the museum and includes alumni of The Webb Schools, current students, and museum friends and supporters. The Peccary Society was named in honor of the peccary skull found by Bill Webb ’39 in 1936. For decades, Alf shared his interest in paleontology with Webb students and those who accompanied him on peccary trips were the earliest members of the Peccary Society. This interest in fossil collecting has never waned, as current Webb students still accompany museum staff on peccary trips and thus are vested as members of a unique club, the Peccary Society. For members of the Peccary Society, the museum offers international peccary trips to Mongolia, China, and Madagascar and also hosts the annual Peccary Society Dinner at which alumni and friends gather to celebrate the museum's continued success.

Collections 

The Raymond Alf Museum of Paleontology acts as a center for paleontological education and research by maintaining and expanding its collection of over 140,000 specimens. The museum is home to eighteen holotypes, most notably the hadrosaur Gryposaurus monumentensis, the ancient horse Megahippus mckennai, and the ancient ungulate Goleroconus alfi. Notable ichnotypes include the arachnid Octopodichnus raymondi and the bear-dog Hirpexipes alfi. Study of the museum’s  collections or loan of specimens may be arranged by contacting the Augustyn Family Curator of Paleontology, Dr. Andrew Farke.

Educational outreach 

The museum offers daily tours of its exhibits to school groups. Special hands-on learning activities are offered to the public on Family Science Discovery Days, which occur on the second Saturday of each month.  Each family day features a different topic with learning stations and related crafts.  Past themes have included "Ancient Sea Life", "Mighty Dinosaurs", and "The Ice Age". The museum also hosts an annual "Fossil Fest", an event that celebrates the excitement of paleontology through hands-on learning for visitors of all ages. Festivities include behind-the-scenes tours of the museum's laboratory, crafts for children, and talks by staff paleontologists which highlight recent museum research projects. The museum also makes available “classroom fossil kits” that include fossils and fossil replicas that can be borrowed by teachers from local schools for their classroom use.

Gallery

External links 
 Raymond M. Alf Museum Official Website
 Dinosaur Joe Website
 The Webb Schools

References 

Dinosaur museums in the United States
Natural history museums in California
Museums in Los Angeles County, California
Claremont, California
Fossil museums
Paleontology in California